Márcio da Cruz (born 6 February 1974) is a Brazilian athlete. He competed in the men's long jump at the 1996 Summer Olympics.

References

1974 births
Living people
Athletes (track and field) at the 1996 Summer Olympics
Brazilian male long jumpers
Olympic athletes of Brazil
Place of birth missing (living people)